Cevico de la Torre is a Spanish municipality belonging to the province of Palencia, in the northern part of the autonomous community of Castile and León.

References

Municipalities in the Province of Palencia